Jönssonligan största kupp (English: The Jönsson Gang's Greatest Robbery) is a Swedish film about the gang Jönssonligan, released to cinemas in Sweden on 3 February 1995.

Cast
Stellan Skarsgård - Herman Melvin
Ulf Brunnberg - Vanheden
Björn Gustafson - Dynamit-Harry
Peter Haber - Doktor Busé
Birgitta Andersson - Doris
Per Grundén - Wall- Enberg
Weiron Holmberg - Johansson "Biffen"
Bernt Lindkvist - Egon Holmberg
Carl Magnus Dellow - Anton Beckman 
Pontus Gustafsson - Konrad Andersson
Gösta Bredefeldt - Josef Burak
Elias Ringquist - Lillis
Lars-Göran Persson - Maffialeader
Maciej Koslowski - Ritzie
Jan Mybrand - Safety guard
Michael Segerström - Safety boss
Yvonne Schaloske - Hotel cleaner

External links
 
 
 

Jönssonligan films
1995 films
Swedish comedy films
Films set in Warsaw
1990s Swedish films